Patiala Babes is an Indian Hindi-language drama television series that premeried on 27 November 2018 on Sony Entertainment Television. Produced by Rajita Sharma and Vivek Budakoti under the banner of Katha Kottage, it starred Paridhi Sharma, Ashnoor Kaur, Aniruddh Dave, Saurabh Raj Jain and Saisha Bajaj. It abruptly ended on 27 March 2020 due to COVID-19.

Seasons overview

Plot
Babita is a shy, innocent woman who is respected in her family. She lives with her in-laws and her 17-year-old daughter, Mini, who is brave and independent. Babita's husband, Ashok Khurana returns to India after 17 years. He cheats on Babita with his business partner, Meeta. Babita breaks down and leaves the house with Mini. Mini helps Babita to divorce Ashok and teaches her to become independent and self-reliant.

Babita opens a catering service, Patiala Babes with Mini's help. Soon, she becomes successful. Now, Meeta who is pregnant with Ashok's child, suffers from Ashok's rude behavior towards her. Mini and Babita help Meeta to become independent. Ashok realizes his mistake and apologizes to them and returns to London with Meeta.

Babita's landlord, Hanuman Singh realizes that he has feelings for Babita. Babita also feels the same. Mini finds this and plans a huge wedding with her friends and grandparents. Hanuman and Babita marry. After wedding, Babita turns into a busy wife and ignores the catering service and Mini. Mini is shocked by her behavior and takes care of catering.

Ashok sends a letter to Mini which kept hidden by Hanuman. Mini finds the letter and Babita burns it before Mini can read. She sells the catering service to an arrogant agent, Khatri much to Mini's dismay. Mini applies for a cinematography course and wins a scholarship for it. She prepares to travel to Australia, shocking Babita and Hanuman. Hanuman's neighbour, Naeem Bi advises them to not to interfere in Mini's future. Mini moves abroad after which Babita realizes her mistake. She finds Mini's letter and misses her.

5 years later
Mini returns to Manali for a project shoot. She calls Hanuman and informs him about it. Hanuman is delighted, so he tries to meet her. But, the next day, Naeem Bi calls Mini and informs her that both Babita and Hanuman have died due to an accident. After that, Mini returns to her home.

Mini tries to return Australia after a few days. She meets her five-year-old half-sister, Arya. Arya informs Mini about Patiala Babes Restaurant, which was opened by Babita after Mini left. Naeem Bi tells that Babita had dreamed that Mini taking care of the restaurant. Then, Mini changes her decision and takes the responsibility of restaurant. She hires a new chef, Neil Oberoi, who lives in Mini's house as a tenant.

A few days later, Mini sees Arya's weird behavior and asks about it. Arya tells her that she is afraid of her school peon, Keval, who is a child abuser. She informs Mini about her friend, Neha who is also a victim of Keval. Mini takes a legal action against Keval everybody's help. In this time, Keval becomes the villain in front of law and gets punished rigorously.

Eventually, Mini and Neil become friends and Mini invites him to share his story with her. The next day, Neil brings Mini to his parents' house. There, Mini learns that Neil is married and now he tries to obtain a divorce. After seeing Neil's daughter Kia, Mini remembers the past how her father Ashok cheated her and Babita. Then, she tries to leave and Neil informs her about how his wife Isha becomes violent to him with her friend Ritwik. After that, Mini takes Neil's side and helps him to take a legal action against Isha.

Cast

Main
 Ashnoor Kaur as Mini "Veer Balika" Babita (formerly Khurana) – Babita and Ashok's daughter; Hanuman's step-daughter; Arya's half-sister; Neil's landlady and love interest; New owner of Patiala Babes Restaurant (2018–2020).
 Paridhi Sharma as Babita "Babes" Chadda Singh – Pinku's sister; Ashok's ex-wife; Hanuman's wife; Mini and Arya's mother; owner of Patiala Babes Restaurant (2018–2019)
 Aniruddh Dave as Inspector Hanuman Singh – Imarti's widower; Babita's husband; Mini's step-father; Arya's father (2018–2019)
 Saisha Bajaj as Arya "Chutanki" Singh – Babita and Hanuman's daughter; Mini's half-sister; Neha's best friend; Montu's nemesis turned friend (2019 –2020)
 Saurabh Raj Jain as Neil Oberoi – Head chef at Patiala Babes Restaurant; Isha's ex-husband; Mini's love interest; Kia's father (2019–2020)

Recurring
 Rushita Vaidya as Preet Kaur – Rano's daughter; Bobby's sister; Mini's best friend; Mickey's fiancée (2018–2020)
 Bhawsheel Sahni as Bobby Singh – Rano's son; Preet's brother who loved Mini (2018–2020)
 Mohit Hiranandani as Makhan "Mickey" Singh Ahluwalia – Preet's fiancé; Mini's brotherly friend (2018–2019)
 Sandhya Shungloo as Naeem Bi – Irfan's mother; Hanuman's foster mother; Kishenchand and Shami's landlady; Mini and Arya's grandmother-figure (2019 – 2020)
 Anoop Puri as Kishenchand Khurana – Ashok and Lovely's father; Mini's grandfather; Arya's adoptive grandfather (2018–2020)
 Poonam Sirnaik as Shami Khurana – Ashok and Lovely's mother; Mini's grandmother; Arya's adoptive grandmother (2018–2020)
 Ushma Rathod as Geeta Kumari – Lalit's wife; Chef in Patiala Babes Restaurant (2019–2020)
 Romit Puri as Inspector Lalit "Laala" Mohan – Hanuman Singh's companion; Geeta's husband (2018–2020)
 Priya Rajput as Raani – Mini and Arya's maid (2019–2020)
 Jasleen Arora as Pooro – Arya's nanny (2019–2020)
 Harish Chhabra as Khursheed Miyan – Chef in Patiala Babes Restaurant (2019–2020)
 Deepika Khanna as Simpy – Chef in Patiala Babes Restaurant (2019–2020)
 Lipika Pradhan as Mrs. Lajo – Mini and Arya's school principal (2019–2020)
 Lavishka Gupta as Neha Malhotra – Vinita's daughter; Arya's best friend who is a victim of child abuse (2020)
 Akanksha Gilani as Vinita Malhotra – Neha's mother (2020)
 Rajesh Chetri as Montu – Arya and Mini's neighbor; Arya's former nemesis and later friend (2019 – 2020)
 Kajal Khanchandani as Mrs. Sandhu – Mini and Arys's neighbour; Montu's grandmother (2019 – 2020)
 Swati Rajput as Jazz – Mini's friend in Australia (2019)
 Bhanujeet Sudan as Ashok Khurana – Kishenchand and Shami's son; Lovely's brother; Babita's ex-husband; Meeta's husband; Mini's father (2018–2019)
 Hunar Hali as Meeta Basu Khurana – Tapan and Sulekha's daughter; Ashok's business partner and second wife (2018–2019)
 Shyn Khurana / Jazz Sodhi as Lovely Khurana Chahal – Kishenchand and Shami's daughter; Ashok's sister; Sukhwinder's wife; Mini's aunt (2018–2019)
 Ashu Sharma as Sukhwinder "Sukhi" Chahal – Jatin's brother; Lovely's husband (2018–2019)
 Aparna Ghoshal as Sulekha Basu – Tapan's wife; Meeta's mother (2019)
 Unknown as Tapan Basu – Sulekha's husband; Meeta's father (2019) 
 Roshni Sahota as Imarti Chautala Singh – Sardar's daughter; Hanuman's late wife (2019)
 Karmveer Choudhary as Sardar Singh Chautala – Imarti's father (2019)
 Saurabh Sharma as Agent Khatri Seth – Babita and Mini's adversary; Kammo's husband (2018–2020)
 Jaspreet Chhabra as Kammo Seth – Khatri's wife, Babita's former friend (2018–2020)
 Sandeep Kapoor as Kartaar Singh – Khatri's best friend (2018–2019)
 Subeer Kasali as Madhu Singh – Kartaar's wife (2018–2019)
 Bindia Kalra as Raano Kaur – Preet and Bobby's mother (2018–2019)
 Payas Pandit as Poonam – Babita's childhood friend (2019)
 Anshumaan Singh as Pinku Chadda – Babita's brother; Saroj's husband; Sonu and Bahar's father; Mini and Arya's uncle (2018–2019)
 Harmanpreet Kaur as Saroj Chadda – Pinku's wife; Sonu and Bahar's mother; Mini and Arya's aunt who tried to separate them (2018–2020)
 Mahinder Shera as Gurmel Singh – Preet's grandfather (2019)
 Mayank Mohan as Manmeet – Mini's nemesis in college (2019)
 Bharat Bhatia as Kittu Saluja – Kammo's nephew; Preet's ex-fiancé (2019)
 Gaurav Roopdas as Irfaan – Naeem Bi's son; Rukshana's husband; Imraan's father (2019)
 Menali Mundra as Rukshana – Irfaan's wife; Imraan's mother (2019)
 Ariyan Sawant as Imraan – Irfaan and Ruksana's son (2019)
 Kirti Sually as Satto Singh – Hanuman's aunt (2019)
Amrita Prakash as Isha Oberoi – Neil's ex-wife; Kia's mother (2020)
 Akshay Arora as the Milkman – Neil's friend who secretly loves Rani (2020)

Production

Casting
On 24 October 2019, news came that leads Paridhi Sharma and Aniruddh Dave, were asked to leave the show overnight after the makers decided to bring Season 2 and leap the storyline by five years. Saurabh Raj Jain was cast as the lead Neil post leap in December 2019.

Cancellation
On 27 March 2020, owing Covid-19 pandemic, the series was temporarily halted as the shootings were stalled. However, in April 2020, on mutual agreement between the makers and channel, it was decided to terminate the series abruptly. Producer Rajita Sharma stated, "Ours was always a finite series, but unfortunately we are unable to shoot the remaining episodes because of the lockdown. None of us know when we will be in a position to resume shooting. So, it was a mutual decision to pull it off air."

Awards

References

External links
 
 Patiala Babes on Sony LIV
 Official website on SET India

Hindi-language television shows
2018 Indian television series debuts
Indian drama television series
2020 Indian television series endings